The 2019 IWBF Women's European Championship was the 17th edition of the European Wheelchair Basketball Championship held in Rotterdam, Netherlands from 30 June to 7 July 2019.

Squads
Each of the 6 teams selected a squad of 12 players for the tournament.

Athletes are given an eight-level-score specific to wheelchair basketball, ranging from 0.5 to 4.5. Lower scores represent a higher degree of disability. The sum score of all players on the court cannot exceed 14.

Preliminary round
''All times local (UTC+01:00)

Knockout stage

Brackets

Semi-finals

Semi-finals

5th place

3rd place

Final

Final standings

References

European Wheelchair Basketball Championship
2019 in wheelchair basketball
2018–19 in Dutch basketball
2018–19 in European basketball
International basketball competitions hosted by the Netherlands
Wheelchair basketball in the Netherlands
Sports competitions in Rotterdam
June 2019 sports events in Europe
July 2019 sports events in Europe